Gus Martin Hollomon (born October 23, 1945) is a former professional American football defensive back in the American Football League and the National Football League.

Football career
He played five seasons for the AFL's Denver Broncos (1968–1969) and the NFL's New York Jets (1970–1972).

References

1945 births
Living people
People from Beaumont, Texas
Players of American football from Texas
Houston Cougars football players
American football punters
American football safeties
Denver Broncos (AFL) players
New York Jets players